Wordie Bay is a bay which lies between Cape Berteaux and Mount Guernsey, to the west of the Wordie Ice Shelf, on the Fallières Coast of the Antarctic Peninsula. It was named by the UK Antarctic Place-names Committee in 1999 in association with the Wordie Ice Shelf.

References

Fallières Coast
Bays of Antarctica